Aisling Byrne-Bowman (born 26 August 1967) is an Irish sailor. She competed at the 1988 Summer Olympics and the 1996 Summer Olympics.

References

External links
 
 

1967 births
Living people
Irish female sailors (sport)
Olympic sailors of Ireland
Sailors at the 1988 Summer Olympics – 470
Sailors at the 1996 Summer Olympics – Europe
Sportspeople from Dublin (city)